The German narrow gauge steam locomotives of military field railway (Heeresfeldbahn) class HF 160 D were  tender locomotives developed for wartime service during the Second World War. The engines were also classified as Kriegsdampflokomotive 11 (wartime steam locomotive 11) or KDL 11. After the war the locomotives were put to use for civilian purposes.

HF 160 D in Austria
In the Austrian Federal Railway (ÖBB), the locomotives were grouped into Class 699. Class 699.1 was a rebuild of the engines into tank locomotives. Class 699 engines could be encountered on several ÖBB narrow gauge railways:  the Bregenzerwald Railway, the Pinzgau Railway, the Waldviertel Narrow Gauge Railway, the Vellach Valley Railway and the Steyr Valley Railway. Six engines had been retired by 1973, number 699.103 belonged to the operating fleet of the Steyrtalbahn until its withdrawal in 1982.

Post 1945
 Société Franco-Belge 2817/1944: HF 2817 → ÖBB 699.101 → Gurk Valley Railway 699.101, operational
 Société Franco-Belge 2818/1944: HF 2818 → ÖBB 699.01 → Club 760 699.01, working, in use on the Taurachbahn
 Société Franco-Belge 2819/1944: HF 2819 → ÖBB 699.102
 Société Franco-Belge 2821/1944: HF 2821 → ÖBB 699.103
 Société Franco-Belge 2822/1944: HF 2822 → ÖBB 699.02 → ? → Deutsches Technikmuseum Berlin, not working
 Société Franco-Belge 2836/1945: ? → CFCD No. 10, working, Chemin de fer Froissy-Dompierre (APPEVA), France
 Société Franco-Belge 2843/1945: ? → AMTP Nr. 4-12, converted to  rail gauge, working, Pithiviers, France;  L'Association du Musée des Transports de Pithiviers
 Société Franco-Belge 2844/1945: ? → No. unknown, converted to  rail gauge, not working, Bligny sur Ouches, France, http://www.lepetittraindebligny.com/
 Société Franco-Belge 2845/1945: ? → Le Petit Train de la Vallee de la Doller, France (loco converted to standard gauge)
 Société Franco-Belge 2855/1944: HF 2855 → SKGLB 19 –without tender→ STLB 699.01 → W&LLR No. 10 Sir Drefaldwyn, Powys, Wales, Great Britain
 Société Franco-Belge 2856/1944: HF 2856 → ÖBB 699.03
 Société Franco-Belge 2857/1944: HF 2857 → ÖBB 699.104

See also
Heeresfeldbahn - German military field railways

References 

 
 
 
 
 

Military locomotives of Germany
Military railway equipment
Franco-Belge locomotives
750 mm gauge locomotives
0-8-0T locomotives
Railway locomotives introduced in 1944